{|

{{Infobox ship career
|Hide header=
|Ship name=MV Diamond Knot
|Ship namesake= 
|Ship country=United States
|Ship flag=
|Ship ordered=as type (C1-M-AV1) hull, MC 
|Ship builder=Consolidated Steel Corporation 
|Ship yard number=
|Ship laid down=
|Ship launched=
|Ship purchased=
|Ship owner	=War Shipping Administration
|Ship operator =
United States Lines 1944 to 1947
Alaska Steamship Co. 1947
|Ship commissioned=December 23, 1944
|Ship decommissioned=
}}

|}
The  was a C1-M-AV1 ship owned by the War Shipping Administration. She was operated by United States Lines from 1944 to 1947 under a bareboat under charter with the Maritime Commission and War Shipping Administration for World War II.

In 1947 she was operated by the Alaska Steamship Co. She sank in the Strait of Juan de Fuca on the night of August 12, 1947, after a collision with the SS Fenn Victory''.  The sinking resulted in the largest collision cargo loss in the waters of the Pacific Coast to that time. The ship was carrying a large cargo of canned salmon, most of which was subsequently recovered, repackaged, and sold.

The wreck remains on the seafloor where it originally sank, at a depth of 70 to 130 ft, and is a popular spot for recreational SCUBA divers

See also
 Type C1 ship

References

Maritime incidents in 1947
Type C1 ships